2019 edition of Senior National Hockey Championship (Men) is the 9th edition of Senior National tournament. Divided into two division's namely Division A and Division B. Division A matches scheduled from 31 January to 7 February 2019 in Gwalior, while Division B matches scheduled from 7 to 20 January 2019 in Chennai.

Teams (A Division)

Pool A
 Hockey Bhopal 
 Kerala Hockey
 Vidarbha Hockey Association

Pool B
 Chhattisgarh Hockey
 Hockey Madhya Bharat 
 Assam Hockey

Pool C
 Hockey Coorg
 Namdhari XI
 Sports Authority of Gujarat - Hockey Academy

Pool D
 Andhra Hockey Association
 Hockey Puducherry
 Hockey Madhya Pradesh

Pool E
 Punjab National Bank
 Telangana Hockey
 Hockey Jammu & Kashmir

Pool F
 Bengal Hockey Association
 Hockey Andhra Pradesh
 Hockey Gujarat

Pool G
 Bengaluru Hockey Association
 Hockey Uttarakhand
 Goans Hockey

Pool H
 Hockey Rajasthan
 Hockey HIM
 Hockey Patiala
 Hockey Nagaland

Teams (B Division)

Pool A

References

2019 in field hockey
Field hockey in India